Loudias is a village of the Chalkidona municipality. Before the 1997 local government reform it was part of the community of Mikro Monastiri. The 2011 census recorded 789 inhabitants in the village.

See also
 List of settlements in the Thessaloniki regional unit

References

Populated places in Thessaloniki (regional unit)